Meurice may refer to:

 François-Désiré Froment-Meurice (1802–1855), French goldsmith
  (born 1938), French cineaste and artist
 Paul Meurice (1818–1905), French novelist and playwright
  (1932–2011), Archbishop of the Archdiocese of Santiago de Cuba

Other 
 Hôtel Meurice, 5-star hotel in Paris
 Meurice Laboratories, former pharmaceutical division of Union chimique belge